The Lycoming ALF 502/LF 507 (now: Honeywell ALF 502/LF 507) is a geared turbofan engine produced by Lycoming Engines, AlliedSignal, and then Honeywell Aerospace.

Development
In mid-1970, Avco Lycoming was advertising two Lycoming T55-derived engines, an LTC4B-12 turboprop and an ALF 502A turbofan, as possible powerplants for the U.S. Air Force's A-X close air support aircraft program. Northrop Corporation signed a contract with Avco Lycoming to use the ALF 502A for its entry into the A-X competition, the Northrop YA-9, in January 1971. The engine was given a United States military aircraft engine designation of YF102-LD-100. Six YF102 engines were built for the YA-9. The  thrust engines powered the A-9A prototypes for seven months of flight tests in 1972, recording 238 flights and 652 flight hours. These engines were later reused in the C-8A Quiet Short-Haul Research Aircraft (QSRA).

The commercial ALF 502D engine was developed from the military YF102 in 1971. Its  derated engine had just one booster compressor stage instead of the YF102's two stages, and operated under a lower turbine temperature to improve reliability. The ALF 502D powered the Dassault Falcon 30 prototype from May 1973 into 1975, logging 270 flight hours until Dassault discontinued development of the aircraft model. The ALF 502D was also chosen for the LearStar 600 executive transport aircraft, which eventually became the Canadair CL-600 Challenger. The CL-600 Challenger first flew in November 1978 and was powered by the  ALF 502L-2, ALF 502L-2A, and ALF 502L-3 variants. The  ALF 502R-3 variant initially powered the quad-engine British Aerospace 146, which entered service in 1983 and became the ALF 502's biggest customer. 1,019 ALF 502 engines of all variants were produced. The LF 507 series based on the ALF 502R was announced in September 1988. The series initially consisted of the hydromechanically controlled LF 507-1H and the FADEC-controlled LF 507-1F, both offering  of thrust. Both variants were used on the Avro RJ update of the BAe 146, and the LF 507-1F was also used on the BAe 146. 818 LF 507 engines were produced.

In 2020, Honeywell sold the type certificate to CFS Aeroproducts Inc. (Arizona), a subsidiary of MRO provider CFS Aeroproducts Ltd (UK), then transferred in January 2021.

Proposed variants

Lycoming announced its LF500 family of turbofans in September 1988, starting with the LF507-1H and LF507-1F, which were certificated in October 1991 and March 1992, respectively. Lycoming introduced the 500 Series of common core engines of turboprops and turbofans in February 1994 as a derivative of the LF507 to power regional aircraft in the late 1990s. A turboprop version also was planned for the European Future Large Aircraft military transport (which would eventually become the Airbus A400M). AlliedSignal, which took over Lycoming in October 1994, demonstration tested the common core in December; the core was capable of producing  of thrust. After losing the competition to power the de Havilland Dash 8-400 regional turboprop, AlliedSignal abandoned the common core effort in July 1995.

Design

The ALF502 is a high bypass turbofan with geared fan, axial-centrifugal flow high pressure compressor, reverse flow annular combustor, two-stage high pressure turbine, two-stage low pressure turbine.

Variants
 ALF502R-3 (single-stage LP compressor)
 ALF502R-4: R-3 with higher thrust
 ALF502R-5: R-4 with improved first-stage and second-stage turbine nozzle assemblies
 ALF502R-3A: R-3 with gas producer turbine improvements, but operated at higher thrust
 ALF502L (two-stage LP compressor)
 ALF502L-2: L with fan blade modification for increased altitude performance
 ALF502L-3: L-2 with turbine improvements and automatic power reserve features
 ALF502L-2A: L-2 with gas producer turbine improvements and automatic power reserve features
 ALF502L-2C: L-2A without automatic power reserve 
 ALF502R-6: L-2C with R-5 accessory gearbox
 LF507-1H: R-6 with lower, flat-rated thrust
 LF507-1F: 507-1H with a single-channel FADEC with hydromechanical backup

Proposed Common Core engines 
(LF500 family/Lycoming 500 Series/AlliedSignal AS800)
 LF508B2: A  engine offered for the quad-turbofan powered, 120-seat British Aerospace Regional JetLiner (formerly BAe 146) in 1992
 LF509: A  turbofan engine for the Avro RJ100
 LF512 / LF514: Additional turbofan engines of  thrust, possibly for Avro's proposed 120-seat RJX twin airliner or for a stretched version of the 50-seat Canadair Regional Jet
 LF518: An  turbofan variant.
 LP512: Turboprop engines targeted for the de Havilland Dash 8-400 and the proposed ATR 82, having an initial power output of  but with uprate capability to

Applications

YF102
 Northrop YA-9
 C-8A Quiet Short-Haul Research Aircraft

ALF 502
 Bombardier Challenger 600: early CL-600 (1A11) series, 81 built from 1978 to 1982
 British Aerospace 146
 Dassault Falcon 30 (prototype)

LF 507
 Avro RJ
 British Aerospace 146
 Yakovlev Yak-40TL (proposed reengine)

Specifications

See also

Notes

References

Further reading

External links

 Honeywell propulsion products page
 Technical details from Swiss International Air Lines

Geared turbofan engines
High-bypass turbofan engines
Honeywell
ALF 502
LF507
Mixed-compressor gas turbines
1980s turbofan engines